Gift Raikhan (born 25 May 1981) is an Indian retired footballer who played as a left-back, and football manager who last managed NEROCA. He also managed Manipur football team in Santosh Trophy.

Playing career
During a playing career which spanned six seasons, Raikhan played for BMFC, Churchill Brothers, HAL, Indian Bank, Vasco, BEML, and Pune. He even played in the I-League.

His favorite moment of his career was during the 2000 Rovers Cup when he scored for BMFC against Churchill Brothers which helped secure his move to the club.

Coaching career
After retiring in 2007, Raikhan joined the Youth System at Pune. From 2008 to 2010 Raikhan was assistant to Norbert Gonsalvez in coaching the u17 and u15 teams. In 2011, he was promoted to head coach of the Pune F.C. Academy U20 side and in 2012 led the team to a championship by finishing first in the 2012 I-League U20.

In September 2013, it was confirmed that Raikhan had been promoted to the first-team at Pune F.C. as the assistant to new head coach Mike Snoei.

In June 2018, Aizawl F.C. announced signing of Raikhan from NEROCA F.C. as head coach for 2018–19 I-League.

Managerial statistics
.

Honours

Managerial

NEROCA
I-League 2nd Division: 2016–17
I-League runner-up: 2017–18

Individual
 Best Coach of 2017–18 I-League

References

Indian footballers
1981 births
Living people
I-League players
Footballers from Manipur
Association football defenders
Aizawl FC managers
Gokulam Kerala FC managers
NEROCA FC managers
Bengal Mumbai FC players
Indian football managers